Tichy may refer to:

Tichy, a town in Algeria
Tichy District, a district in Algeria
Tichý (surname)
Tichy (surname)